The 2013 Malaysia Cup (Malay: Piala Malaysia 2013) was the 87th season of Malaysia Cup and began on 20 August with a preliminary round and finished on 3 November 2013 with the final, held at Shah Alam Stadium. A total of 16 teams took part in the competition. The teams were divided into four groups, each containing four teams. The group leaders and runners-up teams in the groups after six matches qualified to the quarterfinals.

Kelantan were the defending champions, having beaten ATM 3–2 in last season's final. For the second time, a Singaporean team, LIONSXII, also newly minted 2013 Malaysian Super League champions, participated in this competition.

This 87th edition ended with Pahang winning the title after beating Kelantan 1–0, with a goal scored by Matías Conti.

Format 
In this competition, the top 10 teams from 2013 Malaysia Super League is joined by the top 4 teams from 2013 Malaysia Premier League. The remaining 2 teams from 2013 Malaysia Super League and the team who finished 5th and 6th place in the 2013 Malaysia Premier League will battle it out in the playoffs for the remaining 2 spots. The teams will be drawn into four groups of four teams. Voting took place on 27 July at TM Convention Centre, Menara Telekom, Jalan Pantai Baharu, Kuala Lumpur.

Round and draw dates
The draws are held at TM Convention Centre in Kuala Lumpur on 27 July 2013 .

Play-off

Seeding

Group stage

Group A

Group B

Group C

Group D

Knockout stage

Bracket

Quarterfinals

The first legs were played on 27 & 28 September 2013, and the second legs were played on 4 & 5 October 2013.

|}

First leg

Second leg

ATM FA won 4–2 on aggregate.

Pahang FA won 5–3 on aggregate.

Sarawak FA won 3–1 on aggregate.

Kelantan FA won 8–5 on aggregate.

Semi-finals
The first leg will be played on 18 & 19 October while the second leg will be played on 25 & 26 October.

|}

First leg

Second leg

Kelantan FA won 4–3 on aggregate.

Pahang FA won 4–2 on aggregate.

Final

The Final will be played on 3 Nov 2013 at Shah Alam Stadium, Shah Alam.

Winners

Statistics

Top Scorer

Own goals

Hat-tricks

References

2013 in Malaysian football
Malaysia Cup seasons